Argentines in Chile consists of mainly of immigrants and expatriates from Argentina as well as their locally born descendants.

Notable people
 Fermín Vivaceta, architect, teacher and firefighter (born in Santiago) (Argentine citizen father).
 Benito Cerati, singer, musician and composer (born in Santiago) (Argentine father).
 Patricio Lynch, lieutenant in the Royal Navy and a rear admiral in the Chilean Navy (born in Valparaíso) (Irish-Argentine father).
 Matías Fernández, Argentine-born soccer player (born in Caballito) (Argentine mother).
 José Zapiola,  musician, composer and orchestra conductor (born in Santiago) (Argentine father).
 Enriqueta Pinto, Argentine-born First Lady of Chile and the wife of President Manuel Bulnes (born in Tucumán).

References

See also
 Argentina–Chile relations
 Chilean Argentine, Argentines of Chilean descent.

Chile
Argentine